Paul Anderson may refer to:

Entertainment
 Paul Lewis Anderson (1880–1956), American historical novelist and photographer
 Paul 'Trouble' Anderson (1959–2018), British DJ
 Paul W. S. Anderson (born 1965), British film director
 Paul Thomas Anderson (born 1970), American film director
 Paul Anderson (actor) (born 1978), British actor
 Paul Anderson, author of Hunger's Brides
 Paul Anderson, producer of the musical group The Piano Guys
 Paul Anderson (cartoonist), American cartoonist, known for the comic strip Marmaduke, created by his father Brad

Politics
 Paul Anderson (Minnesota state representative) (born 1951), member of the Minnesota House of Representatives
 Paul Anderson (Minnesota state senator) (born 1973)
 Paul Anderson (Nevada politician) (born 1970), member of the Nevada Assembly

Sports
 Paul Anderson (weightlifter) (1932–1994), American weightlifter
 Paul Anderson (sailor) (1935–2022), British sailor
 Paul Anderson (cricketer) (born 1966), English cricketer
 Paul Anderson (rugby league, born 1971), English rugby league footballer who played in the 1990s and 2000s, and coached in the 2010s
 Paul Anderson (rugby league, born 1977), English rugby league footballer who played in the 1990s and 2000s
 Paul Anderson (footballer) (born 1988), English footballer

Other
 Paul Y. Anderson (1893–1938), American muckracker
 Paul R. Anderson (1907–1993), president of Temple University
 Paul Francis Anderson (1917–1987), American bishop
 Paul S. Anderson (born 1938), American chemist
 Paul Anderson (judge) (born 1943), Minnesota judge
 Paul L. Anderson (1946–2018), Mormon architectural historian and curator
 Paul N. Anderson (born 1956), American biblical scholar
 Paul Anderson (journalist) (born 1959), British journalist

See also 
 Poul Anderson (1926–2001), American science fiction author
 Poul Andersen (disambiguation)